The National Football League (NFL) have drafted 273 players who had played for the University of Arkansas Razorbacks since the league began holding drafts in 1936. The Razorbacks' highest draft position was second overall in 1954, when Lamar McHan was selected by the Chicago Cardinals. Arkansas' first drafted player in the NFL was Jack Robbins, who was the fifth overall pick by the Chicago Cardinals in 1938. One former player was selected from the latest NFL draft: Jonathan Marshall in the 6th Round to the New York Jets.

Each NFL franchise seeks to add new players through the annual NFL draft. The team with the worst record the previous year picks first, the next-worst team second, and so on. Teams that did not make the playoffs are ordered by their regular-season record, with any remaining ties broken by strength of schedule. Playoff participants are sequenced after non-playoff teams, based on their round of elimination (wild card, division, conference, and Super Bowl).

Before the AFL–NFL merger agreements in 1966, the American Football League (AFL) operated in direct competition with the NFL and held a separate draft. This led to a massive bidding war over top prospects between the two leagues. As part of the merger agreement on June 8, 1966, the two leagues would hold a multiple round "Common Draft". Once the AFL officially merged with the NFL in 1970, the "common draft" simply became the NFL draft.

Key

Drafts

American Football League

National Football League

Notes

References
General

 
 
 
 
 

Specific

Arkansas Razorbacks

Arkansas Razorbacks NFL draft